László Cseke (born 24 August 1975) is a Hungarian footballer who plays for Békéscsabai Előre FC as a midfielder.

External links
Profile at hlsz.hu

1975 births
Living people
People from Szekszárd
Hungarian footballers
Association football midfielders
Szekszárdi UFC footballers
Budapesti VSC footballers
Dunaújváros FC players
Celldömölki VSE footballers
Békéscsaba 1912 Előre footballers
FC Ajka players
Sportspeople from Tolna County